Nishii (written: 西井 or 西飯) is a Japanese surname. Notable people with the surname include:

, Japanese magazine editor and photography critic
, Japanese table tennis player

See also
Nishi (disambiguation)

Japanese-language surnames